Aleksandar Živanović (born 8 April 1987) is Serbian professional footballer who plays as a centre-back for the Lithuanian club Sūduva Marijampolė in the A Lyga.

Career 
Matured in Železničar and Sinđelić in his birth town, Živanović played several years for Sinđelić Niš. After short stint with Radnički Niš he moved to, then Serbian SuperLiga club Čukarički. After half season spent in Hajduk Kula, he has finally settled in Jagodina.

On 17 February 2017 Živanović joined Lithuanian club Sūduva Marijampolė.

Honours
Jagodina
 Serbian Cup: 2013

Sūduva
 A Lyga: 2017, 2018, 2019
 Lithuanian Football Cup: 2019
 Lithuanian Supercup: 2018, 2019

References

External sources
 Stats and bio at Utakmica.rs
 info at Uefa.com

1987 births
Living people
Sportspeople from Niš
Serbian footballers
FK Sinđelić Niš players
FK Radnički Niš players
FK Čukarički players
FK Hajduk Kula players
FK Jagodina players
FK Mladost Lučani players
FK Sūduva Marijampolė players
Serbian SuperLiga players
A Lyga players
Association football defenders
Serbian expatriate footballers
Expatriate footballers in Lithuania
Serbian expatriate sportspeople in Lithuania